Rijpfjorden is a fjord at the northern side of Nordaustlandet, Svalbard. Former names of the fjord include Rypefjorden, Red Currant Bay and Ripsbai. The fjord is named after Dutch explorer Jan Rijp, who never came anywhere near it.

References

Fjords of Svalbard
Nordaustlandet